Black Mountain is a summit in West Virginia, United States. It is one of the Yew Mountains in Pocahontas County.

Black Mountain was named for the dark, forested tracts near it.

References

Mountains of Pocahontas County, West Virginia
Mountains of West Virginia